Charles Allard (29 December 1885 – 2 April 1965) was a New Zealand cricketer. He played in one first-class match for Canterbury in 1920/21.

See also
 List of Canterbury representative cricketers

References

External links
 

1885 births
1965 deaths
New Zealand cricketers
Canterbury cricketers
Cricketers from Christchurch